JDS Hayashio (SS-521) was the lead boat of the s. She was commissioned on 30 June 1962.

Construction and career
Hayashio was laid down at Mitsubishi Heavy Industries Kobe Shipyard on 6 June 1960 and launched on 31 July 1961. She was commissioned on 30 June 1962.

On 1 August 1962, the 1st Submarine Corps was newly formed and incorporated under the Kure District Force.

On 1 March 1963, the 1st Submarine was reorganized under the Self-Defense Fleet.

From 2 June to 19 August 1964, she participated in Hawaii dispatch training with JDS Wakashio.

On 1 February 1965, the 1st Submarine was reorganized into the 1st Submarine Group, which was newly formed under the Self-Defense Fleet.

At around 6:40 pm on 20 May 1970, she came into contact with a large merchant ship during a dive training in a water area about 30 km east of Tanegashima, Kagoshima Prefecture, and damaged her periscope.

She was decommissioned on 25 July 1977 and dismantled at Furusawa Steel in Etajima-cho in November 1977.

Citations

External links

1961 ships
Hayashio-class submarines
Ships built by Mitsubishi Heavy Industries